Jack Patrick Barthram (born 13 October 1993) is an English footballer who most recently played for Isthmian League club Haringey Borough.

Career

Swindon Town

Barthram began his career with Tottenham Hotspur, joining from non-league club Buckhurst Hill, and after progressing the club's youth system, he signed his first professional contract in July 2012. However, in June 2013, Barthram was released by the club.

Weeks after being released by Tottenham Hotspur, Barthram joined Swindon Town on 25 June 2013, signing a one-year contract, with an option to extend. Upon joining the club, he was given number twenty-three shirt ahead of the new season. He made his professional debut in a 1–0 victory against Torquay United on 6 August 2013 in the Football League Cup. He scored his first career goal in a Football League Trophy tie against Plymouth Argyle. Weeks later on 26 October 2013, he made his first start and played the whole game, in a 2–1 loss against Oldham Athletic. However, Barthram struggled to become the first team regular, due to competitions, despite impressive as a substitute and finished his first season, making fifteen appearances and scoring once in all competitions. Although he proved himself despite losing 2–1 to Rotherham United on the final game of the season, he signed a one-year contract extension with the club.

In the 2014–15 season, Barthram struggled with an abductor tear in the pre-season tour, which he missed out two friendly matches in late-July. Despite this, he made his first appearance of the season, playing as a left-back and played 68 minutes before substituted, in a 1–0 loss against Crawley Town on 16 August 2014. However, once again, Barthram continued to struggled to find his first team football opportunities and was demoted to the club's reserve squad. After training with League Two side Exeter City in hopes of joining them on loan, this never happened and stayed at the club for the rest of the season. As the 2014–15 season was coming to a close, Bartham had a first team chance: appearing two starts against Preston North End At the end of the 2014–15 season, making nine appearances in all competitions, Barthram was released by the club upon expiry of his contract.

Cheltenham Town

Several weeks after being released by Swindon Town, Barthram signed for Cheltenham Town on 23 June 2015. Upon joining the club, Barthram said his aim was to help the club win the league after the club was relegated from League Two. Upon joining the club, he was given number two shirt.

Barthram made his Cheltenham Town debut, starting as a right-back and playing the whole the game, in a 1–1 draw against Lincoln City in the opening game of the season. Weeks later on 23 August 2015, in a 2–1 win over Barrow, he set up a goal for Kyle Storer to score an equaliser. Since making Cheltenham Town, Barthram became a first team regular, becoming a first choice as a right-back and helped the side reach back to League Two. At the end of the 2015–16 season, Barthram signed a contract extension.

In the 2016–17 season, Barthram started the season when he faced competitions and was placed on the substitute bench. Barthram scored his first goal for Cheltenham in an FA Cup tie against Crewe Alexandra on 15 November 2016, which saw them go through after beating 4–1. His second goal of the season came on 31 January 2017, in a 3–2 win over Luton Town. However, as the 2016–17 season progressed, Barthram struggled to regain his first team opportunities in his second season at Cheltenham Town, as well as his own injury concern. Nevertheless, he went on to make twenty-four appearances and scoring twice in all competitions. However, Bartham was released by the club.

Barrow
On 1 August 2017, Barthram signed for National League club Barrow on a one-year contract. He opened his scoring account for the club against Boreham Wood F.C. He was released on 6 May 2019.

FC United and Haringey
On 15 October 2019 it was confirmed, that Barthram had joined F.C. United of Manchester. He left the club in January 2020 to join Haringey Borough.

Career statistics

Club

Honours

Cheltenham Town
Vanarama National League Winners: 2015-16

References

External links

1993 births
Living people
English footballers
Association football defenders
Tottenham Hotspur F.C. players
Swindon Town F.C. players
English Football League players
Cheltenham Town F.C. players
Barrow A.F.C. players
F.C. United of Manchester players
Haringey Borough F.C. players
National League (English football) players